Aleksei Vladimirovich Sapayev (born 28 January 1983) is a Russian former professional football player.

Club career
He made his Russian Football National League debut for FC Irtysh Omsk on 18 April 2010 in a game against FC Avangard Kursk.

External links
 
 

1983 births
Sportspeople from Omsk
Living people
Russian footballers
Association football midfielders
FC Irtysh Omsk players
FC Sakhalin Yuzhno-Sakhalinsk players
FC Novokuznetsk players
FC Dynamo Bryansk players